Customized Applications for Mobile networks Enhanced Logic (CAMEL) is a set of standards designed to work on either a GSM core network or the Universal Mobile Telecommunications System (UMTS) network.  The framework provides tools for operators to define additional features for standard GSM services/UMTS services.  The CAMEL architecture is based on the Intelligent Network (IN) standards, and uses the CAP protocol.  The protocols are codified in a series of ETSI Technical Specifications.

Many services can be created using CAMEL, and it is particularly effective in allowing these services to be offered when a subscriber is roaming, like, for instance, No-prefix dialing (the number the user dials is the same no matter the country where the call is placed) or seamless MMS message access from abroad.

CAMEL entities
GSM Service Control Function (gsmSCF)
GSM Service Switching Function (gsmSSF)
GSM Specialized Resource Function (gsmSRF)
GPRS Service Switching Function (gprsSSF)

Specifications
CAMEL specification were published in phases, with four phases having been established  , each building on the previous.  Phases 1 and 2 were defined before 3G networks existed, and as such support adding IN services to a GSM network, although they are equally applicable to 2.5G and 3G networks. Phase 3 was defined for 3GPP Releases 99 and 4, and hence is a GSM and UMTS common specification, while Phase 4 was defined as part of 3GPP Release 5.

In line with other GSM specifications, later phases should be fully backwards compatible with earlier phases;  this is achieved by means of the Transaction Capabilities Application Part (TCAP) Application Context (AC) negotiation procedure, with each CAMEL phase is allocated its own AC version.

Phase 1
CAMEL Phase 1 defined only very basic call control services, but introduced the concept of a CAMEL Basic call state model (BCSM) to the Intelligent Network (IN).  Phase 1 gave the gsmSCF the ability to bar calls (release the call prior to connection), allow a call to continue unchanged, or to modify a limited number of call parameters before allowing it to continue.  The gsmSCF could also monitor the status of a call for certain events (call connection and disconnection), and take appropriate action on being informed of the event.
 
Phase 1 was defined as part of Release 96 in 1997.

Phase 2
CAMEL Phase 2 enhanced the capabilities defined in Phase 1.  In addition to supporting the facilities of Phase 1, Phase 2 included the following:
 Additional event detection points
 Interaction between a user and a service using announcements, voice prompting and information collection via in-band interaction or Unstructured Supplementary Service Data (USSD) interaction
 Control of call duration and transfer of Advice of Charge Information to the mobile station; 
 The ability to inform the gsmSCF about the invocation of the supplementary services Explicit Call Transfer (ECT), Call Deflection (CD) and Multi-Party Calls (MPTY)
 The ability, for easier post-processing, of integrating charging information from a serving node in normal call records

Phase 2 was defined as part of 3GPP Releases 97 and 98, in 1998, although it is referenced in the stage 1 specification of Release 96.

Phase 3
The third phase of CAMEL enhanced the capabilities of phase 2. The following capabilities were added:
 Support of facilities to avoid overload
 Capabilities to support Dialed Services 
 Capabilities to handle mobility events, such as (Not-)reachability and roaming;
 Control of GPRS sessions and PDP contexts
 Control of Mobile Originated SMS through both circuit-switched and packet-switched serving network entities
 Interworking with SoLSA (Support of Localised Service Area). Support for this interworking is optional;
 The gsmSCF can be informed about the invocation of the supplementary service Call Completion to Busy Subscriber (CCBS)

Phase 3 was released as part of 3GPP Releases 99 and 4 in 1999.

Phase 4
The fourth phase of CAMEL built on the capabilities of phase 3. The following features were defined:
 Support for Optimal Routing of circuit-switched mobile-to-mobile calls
 The capability for the gsmSCF to create additional parties in an existing call (Call Party Handling)
 The capability for the gsmSCF to create a new call unrelated to any other existing call (Call Party Handling - new call)
 Capabilities for the enhanced handling of call party connections (Call Party Handling)
 Control of Mobile Terminated SMS through both circuit-switched and packet-switched serving network entities
 The capability for the gsmSCF to control sessions in the IP Multimedia Subsystem (IMS)
 The gsmSCF can request the gsmSSF to play a fixed or a variable sequence of tones

With CAMEL Phase 4, it is possible that only a limited subset of the new functionalities is supported, in addition to the complete support of CAMEL Phase 3.

Phase 4 was released as part of 3GPP Release 5 in 2002.

See also
 Open Services Architecture
 IP Multimedia Subsystem
 Service layer
 Camel

References

Signaling System 7
GSM standard